John Lindsay Armitage OAM (11 November 1920 – 13 April 2009) was an Australian politician. Born in Sydney, he was educated at Sydney Technical High School before undergoing military service from 1942 to 1945. He became a bank officer with the Commonwealth and Reserve Banks before his election to the Australian House of Representatives in 1961, when he defeated Roy Wheeler for the seat of Mitchell, representing the Labor Party. He was defeated by Liberal Les Irwin in 1963, but in 1969 won the new seat of Chifley. He held the position until his retirement in 1983.

References

Australian Labor Party members of the Parliament of Australia
Members of the Australian House of Representatives for Chifley
Members of the Australian House of Representatives for Mitchell
Members of the Australian House of Representatives
Australian Army personnel of World War II
Recipients of the Medal of the Order of Australia
1920 births
2009 deaths
20th-century Australian politicians
Australian Army soldiers